Shed No Tears refers to:

 Shed No Tears (1948 film), American film
 Shed No Tears (2013 film), Swedish film